NGC 1846 is a globular cluster containing hundreds of thousands of stars in the outer halo of the Large Magellanic Cloud. It was discovered on November 6, 1826 by James Dunlop and is included in the New General Catalogue. At an aperture of 50 arcseconds, its apparent V-band magnitude is 10.68, but at this wavelength, it has 0.07 magnitudes of interstellar extinction.

NGC 1846 is about 1.7 billion years old. All else equal, older star clusters have higher mass-to-luminosity ratios; that is, they have lower luminosities for the same mass.

In an image taken by the Hubble Space Telescope in 2006 (see picture), astronomers spotted a green planetary nebula towards the bottom of the image. It is uncertain whether NGC 1846 contains this planetary nebula or if it just happened to be on the same line of sight; however, measurements of the motion of the cluster's stars along with the nebula's central star lead to the conclusion that it is a member of the cluster.

References

External links 
 

1846
Globular clusters
Large Magellanic Cloud
Dorado (constellation)